Tina Frühauf (born 23 September 1972 in Essen, Germany) is a German-American musicologist. She is Adjunct Associate Professor at Columbia University in New York and serves on the doctoral faculty of the  Graduate Center, CUNY. She is Executive Director of Répertoire International de Littérature Musicale.

Frühauf's teaching and research draw upon diverse methods and perspectives in scholarship to forge a broad and interdisciplinary musicology centered around history, performance, and ethnography. She is particularly interested in the interstices between music and religion. The study of Jewish music in modernity has provided a primary focus for research for two decades, and has provided the context for her more recent ventures into new fields of inquiry, that is music and postmodernity and music and temporality. She has been conducting research in Israel, Germany, and the United States, and her work in these countries is ongoing.

Frühauf's research in the area of music and Jewish studies has been funded by the American Musicological Society, the Leo Baeck Institute, the Memorial Foundation for Jewish Culture, the German Academic Exchange Program (DAAD), among other organizations.

Her volume Dislocated Memories: Jews, Music, and Postwar German Culture (Oxford University Press, 2014), co-edited with Lily E. Hirsch, won the Ruth A. Solie Award from the American Musicological Society, and the Award for Excellence for an Edited Volume on Jewish Studies and Music, Jewish Studies and Music Study Group, American Musicological Society. Her book Transcending Dystopia, Music, Mobility, and the Jewish Community in Postwar Germany (Oxford University Press, 2021) was a finalist of the 2022 Jordan Schnitzer Awards of the Association for Jewish Studies,

In 2019, Frühauf has been DAAD Guest Professor at the Hochschule für Musik und Theater München, where she laid the groundwork for the establishment of the Paul Ben-Haim Center, which is devoted to the study of music before, during, and after Nazism.

Publications
Books/Monographs/Editions
 Orgeln und Orgelmusik in deutsch-jüdischer Kultur, Netiva: Wege deutsch-jüdischer Geschichte und Kultur 6. Hildesheim: Georg Olms Verlag, 2005
 The Organ and Its Music in German-Jewish Culture. New York: Oxford University Press, 2009
 Salomon Sulzer: Reformer, Cantor, Icon / Salomon Sulzer: Reformer, Kantor, Kultfigur. Berlin: Hentrich & Hentrich, 2012
 German-Jewish Organ Music: An Anthology of Works from the 1820s to the 1960s. Middleton, WI: A-R Editions, 2013
 Hans Samuel: Selected Piano Works. Middleton, WI: A-R Editions, 2013
 Dislocated Memories: Jews, Music, and Postwar German Culture, edited with Lily Hirsch. New York: Oxford University Press, 2014
 Referencing Music in the Twenty-first Century: Encyclopedias of the Past, Present, and Future. Fontes Artis Musicae LXIII/3 (July–September 2016)
 Werner Sander, "To Finally Fortify Peace": A Vital Exponent of Jewish Music in the GDR / Werner Sander, "den Frieden endgültig zu festigen": Ein grosser Vertreter der jüdischen Musik in der DDR. Teetz: Hentrich & Hentrich, 2017
 Orgeln und Orgelmusik in deutsch-jüdischer Kultur, Netiva: Wege deutsch-jüdischer Geschichte und Kultur 6. Hildesheim: Georg Olms Verlag, 2017. [2nd revised edition]
 Experiencing Jewish Music in America: A Listener's Companion. Lanham, MD: Rowman & Littlefield, 2018
 Postmodernity's Musical Pasts. Woodbridge: Boydell Press, 2020
 Transcending Dystopia: Music, Mobility, and the Jewish Community in Germany, 1945—1989. New York: Oxford University Press, 2021
 Jüdische Musik im süddeutschen Raum / Mapping Jewish Music of Southern Germany. Munich: Allitera, 2021

References

German musicologists
1972 births
Living people